Bette Keener Archuleta (May 22, 1928 – October 31, 1998), also called Qued, was a Cherokee-American painter from Pawhuska, Oklahoma. She began painting in her 30s and went on to exhibit across the United States, including at the Museum of New Mexico and at the Inter-Tribal Indian Ceremonials.

Born Betty Lou Keener, she was interested in drawing as a child. She married Marcos Lawrance Archuleta in 1953, and began painting in 1961 with education at the Doris Fitz School of Art in Woodward, Oklahoma. She was active in the local art club. Archuleta's work can be found in a number of private collections.

Archuleta died on October 31, 1998, in Wagoner, Oklahoma. She is buried at the Keener Cemetery in Lost City, Cherokee County, Oklahoma.

References 

1928 births
1998 deaths
20th-century indigenous people of the Americas
20th-century American women artists
Native American painters
Cherokee artists
People from Pawhuska, Oklahoma
20th-century Native Americans
20th-century Native American women
Native American women artists